Joseph Everett Mitchell (August 1, 1876 – December 17, 1952) was an American publisher known for his newspaper, the St. Louis Argus. It advocated for civil rights and served the African-American community in St. Louis. Mitchell also co-founded the Citizen's Liberty League to support African-American political candidates.

Early years and personal life
The fourth of eight children, Mitchell was born on August 1, 1876, in Coosa County, Alabama, to a farming family. As a child, he often worked in his father's sawmill. In 1898, he joined the United States Army and served with the 24th Infantry Regiment until 1901. That same year, after returning home, he married Mattie Elizabeth Thomas.

In 1904, in part because of the World’s Fair, the Mitchells relocated to St. Louis, Missouri, where J. E. completed school by taking night classes. In the 1930s, Mattie Mitchell died and, in 1940, J. E. married Edwina Wright, a St. Louis public school teacher and the daughter of banker Richard R. Wright.

Career
Soon after settling in St. Louis, Mitchell began employment with the Western Union Relief Association, an insurance company where he worked as general manager by 1905. Mitchell grew increasingly focused on the company’s newsletter, which eventually grew into the St. Louis Argus newspaper. After the insurance company failed, Mitchell, along with his brother William, registered the St. Louis Argus with the Post Office in 1912. In 1916, they incorporated the St. Louis Argus Publishing Company. Mitchell served as publisher and managing editor.

Honors
In 1954, Mitchell was posthumously honored by Lincoln University, which renamed its Journalism Building to Mitchell Hall. In 1964, St. Louis Public Schools opened Mitchell Elementary School, named for Joseph and his brother William. Mitchell was enshrined in the National Newspaper Publishers Association in 1978.

References

1876 births
1953 deaths
People from Coosa County, Alabama
African-American journalists
United States Army soldiers
American military personnel of the Spanish–American War
African-American United States Army personnel
Journalists from Alabama
Activists from St. Louis
20th-century African-American people